Mille can refer to:

People 
 Constantin Mille, Romanian journalist and politician
 Mathieu Mille, French ice hockey player

Places 
 Mille Lacs County, Minnesota
 Mille Lacs Lake in Minnesota.
 Mille River, a tributary of the Awash River in Ethiopia
 Mille (woreda), a district in Ethiopia
 An alternative spelling for Mili Atoll

Transportation 
 Aprilia RSV Mille, a motorcycle.
 Fiat Mille, the Brazilian Fiat Uno in its 1.0 L version
 Mille Miglia, an open-road endurance race which took place in Italy twenty-four times from 1927 to 1957

Other uses 
 Mille (card game), a card game for two players
 Mille (TV series), a Danish television series
 "Mille" (song), an Italian pop song
 Mill (currency), or mille, a now-abstract currency
Per mille, parts per thousand
Cost per mille used in advertising
I Mille 'The Thousand', the volunteers in the Expedition of the Thousand, a military action of the Italian Risorgimento, 1860

See also
 DeMille
 Mill (disambiguation)
 Mille Bornes, another French card game
 Mille-feuille, a pastry made of several layers of puff pastry
 Mille Plateaux
 Millie (disambiguation)